Understeer and oversteer are vehicle dynamics terms used to describe the sensitivity of a vehicle to steering. Oversteer is what occurs when a car turns (steers) by more than the amount commanded by the driver. Conversely, understeer is what occurs when a car steers less than the amount commanded by the driver.

Automotive engineers define understeer and oversteer based on changes in steering angle associated with changes in lateral acceleration over a sequence of steady-state circular turning tests. Car and motorsport enthusiasts often use the terminology more generally in magazines and blogs to describe vehicle response to steering in a variety of maneuvers.

Vehicle dynamics terminology
Standard terminology used to describe understeer and oversteer are defined by the Society of Automotive Engineers (SAE) in document J670 and by the International Organization for Standardization (ISO) in document 8855. By these terms, understeer and oversteer are based on differences in steady-state conditions where the vehicle is following a constant-radius path at a constant speed with a constant steering wheel angle, on a flat and level surface.

Understeer and oversteer are defined by an understeer gradient (K) that is a measure of how the steering needed for a steady turn changes as a function of lateral acceleration. Steering at a steady speed is compared to the steering that would be needed to follow the same circular path at low speed. The low-speed steering for a given radius of turn is called Ackermann steer. The vehicle has a positive understeer gradient if the difference between required steer and the Ackermann steer increases with respect to incremental increases in lateral acceleration. The vehicle has a negative gradient if the difference in steer decreases with respect to incremental increases in lateral acceleration.

Understeer and oversteer are formally defined using the gradient “K”. If K is positive, the vehicle shows understeer; if K is negative, the vehicle shows oversteer; if K is zero, the vehicle is neutral.

Several tests can be used to determine understeer gradient: constant radius (repeat tests at different speeds), constant speed (repeat tests with different steering angles), or constant steer (repeat tests at different speeds). Formal descriptions of these three kinds of testing are provided by ISO. Gillespie goes into some detail on two of the measurement methods.

Results depend on the type of test, so simply giving a deg/g value is not sufficient; it is also necessary to indicate the type of procedure used to measure the gradient.

Vehicles are inherently nonlinear systems, and it is normal for K to vary over the range of testing. It is possible for a vehicle to show understeer in some conditions and oversteer in others. Therefore, it is necessary to specify the speed and lateral acceleration whenever reporting understeer/oversteer characteristics.

Contributions to understeer gradient
Many properties of the vehicle affect the understeer gradient, including tire cornering stiffness, camber thrust, lateral force compliance steer, self aligning torque, lateral weight transfer, and compliance in the steering system. Weight distribution affects the normal force on each tire and therefore its grip. These individual contributions can be identified analytically or by measurement in a Bundorf analysis.

Simple understanding of real-world handling characteristics 
While much of this article is focused on the empirical measurement of understeer gradient, this section concentrates on road performance.

Understeer can typically be understood as a condition where, while cornering, the front tires begin to slip first. Since the front tires are slipping and the rear tires have grip, the vehicle will turn less than if all tires had grip. Since the amount of turning is less than it would be if all tires had traction, this is known as under-steering.

The opposite is true if the rear tires break traction first. The front tires will continue to accelerate the front of the vehicle laterally, tracing a circle. The rear tires will have a tendency to continue along the tangent of that circle but cannot because of their attachment to the front of the car, which still has traction. The result is that the rear tires will swing outwards relative to the front of the vehicle. This turns the vehicle towards the inside of the curve. If the steering angle is not changed (i.e. the steering wheel stays in the same position), then the front wheels will trace out a smaller and smaller circle while the rear wheels continue to swing around the front of the car. This is what is happening when a car 'spins out'. A car susceptible to oversteer is sometimes known as 'tail happy', as in the way a dog wags its tail when happy and a common problem in negative-k vehicles is fishtailing.

A car is called 'neutral' when the front and rear tires will lose traction at the same time.  This is desirable because while the vehicle may slide towards the outside of the turn, it maintains the effective steering angle set by the driver. This makes it 'safer' to drive near the limit condition of traction because the outcome of breaking traction is more predictable.

In real-world driving (where both the speed and turn radius may be constantly changing) several extra factors affect the distribution of traction and the tendency to oversteer or understeer. These can primarily be split up into things that affect weight distribution to the tires and extra frictional loads put on each tire.

The weight distribution of a vehicle at standstill will affect handling. If the center of gravity is moved closer to the front axle, the vehicle tends to understeer due to tire load sensitivity. When the center of gravity is toward the back of the vehicle, the rear axle tends to swing out, which is oversteer. Weight transfer is inversely proportional to the direction and magnitude of acceleration, and is proportional to the height of the center of gravity. When braking, weight is transferred to the front and the rear tires have less traction. When accelerating, weight will transfer to the rear and decrease front tire traction. In extreme cases, the front tires may completely lift off the ground meaning no steering input can be transferred to the ground at all.

Tires must transmit the forces of acceleration and braking to the ground in addition to lateral forces of turning. These vectors are added, and if the new vector exceeds the tire's maximum static frictional force in any direction, the tire will slip. If a rear-wheel-drive vehicle has enough power to spin the rear wheels, it can initiate oversteer at any time by sending enough engine power to the wheels that they start spinning. Once traction is broken, they are relatively free to swing laterally. Under braking load, more work is typically done by the front brakes. If this forward bias is too great, then the front tires may lose traction, causing understeer.

While weight distribution and suspension geometry have the greatest effect on measured understeer gradient in a steady-state test, power distribution, brake bias and front-rear weight transfer will also affect which wheels lose traction first in many real-world scenarios.

Limit conditions

When an understeer vehicle is taken to the grip limit of the tires, where it is no longer possible to increase lateral acceleration, the vehicle will follow a path with a radius larger than intended. Although the vehicle cannot increase lateral acceleration, it is dynamically stable.

When an oversteer vehicle is taken to the grip limit of the tires, it becomes dynamically unstable with a tendency to spin. Although the vehicle is unstable in open-loop control, a skilled driver can maintain control past the point of instability with countersteering, and/or correct use of the throttle or even brakes; this can be referred to as drifting.

Related measures
Understeer gradient is one of the main measures for characterizing steady-state cornering behavior. It is involved in other properties such as characteristic speed (the speed for an understeer vehicle where the steer angle needed to negotiate a turn is twice the Ackermann angle), lateral acceleration gain (g's/deg), yaw velocity gain (1/s), and critical speed (the speed where an oversteer vehicle has infinite lateral acceleration gain).

References

Automotive steering technologies
Automotive safety
Driving techniques
Tires
Vehicle dynamics